Dummy Tappasu is a 2015 Indian Tamil-language romantic comedy film directed by O. S. Ravi. The film stars Malayalam actor Praveen Prem and debutante Ramya Pandian.

Cast 
Praveen Prem as Shree
Ramya Pandian as Soumya
John Vijay
Singamuthu as a rowdy
 Niranjan Venky
Bonda Mani
 Jenny
 Uma
Mime Gopi

Production 
Malayalam comedian Praveen Prem was signed to play the lead role as the film required a plump man to play the lead role. The film highlights the life in the slums of Chennai. The film began production under the title Tapsa. Deva was brought in to compose the music. A few scenes were shot in black and white.

Soundtrack 
The songs were composed by Deva.
"Adiayae Flowerae" – Mukesh Mohamed
"Anju Pathu Kadanai" – Deva
"Enna Idhu Vayasu" – Lakshmi Chandru
"Yenda En Magane" – Kavitha Gopi

Reception 
Maalai Malar praised the cinematography and performances of the lead cast, while criticising the lack of interesting scenes.

Notes

References

External links 

2015 directorial debut films
2015 films
2015 romantic comedy films
Films scored by Deva (composer)
Indian romantic comedy films